Choluteca Airport  is an airport serving the city of Choluteca in Choluteca Department, Honduras. The airport ICAO code is also variously listed as MHCH.

The airport is on the eastern edge of the city. The runway length does not include a  paved overrun on the northeast end.

See also

Transport in Honduras
List of airports in Honduras

References

External links
HERE Maps - Choluteca
OurAirports - Choluteca Airport
OpenStreetMap - Choluteca

Airports in Honduras